Mikheil Ashvetia (born 10 November 1977) is a Georgian former footballer. He has played mostly in Georgia and Russia, except for a short spell at FC København in 2001–2002 and a recent spell in Germany with FC Carl Zeiss Jena. In Russia he has played for Alania Vladikavkaz, Lokomotiv Moscow, Rubin Kazan and FC Rostov. While playing for Lokomotiv, he scored a notable Champion League 2003–04 goal against Inter Milan making a score 2–0 for Lokomotiv. His team went ahead and won the game with an impressive 3–0 result.

He played for the Georgian national team between 1995 and 2005, and was capped 24 times, scoring five goals.

Honours

Individual 
CIS Cup top goalscorer: 2001 (shared)

References

External links
 
 Appearances for Georgia National Team

1977 births
Living people
Sportspeople from Kutaisi
Footballers from Georgia (country)
Expatriate footballers from Georgia (country)
Georgia (country) international footballers
FC Torpedo Kutaisi players
FC Dinamo Tbilisi players
FC Spartak Vladikavkaz players
FC Lokomotiv Moscow players
FC Rostov players
FC Rubin Kazan players
FC Anzhi Makhachkala players
FC Dynamo Barnaul players
F.C. Copenhagen players
FC Carl Zeiss Jena players
Expatriate men's footballers in Denmark
Expatriate footballers in Germany
Expatriate footballers in Russia
Russian Premier League players
Erovnuli Liga players
2. Bundesliga players
FC Nizhny Novgorod (2007) players
Association football forwards